The UMBRO Futsal Awards are the annual awards to celebrate the best people in international futsal. They are presented since the year of 2000 by FutsalPlanet.

Best Player in the World

Male

Female

Best Goalkeeper in the World

Male

Female

Best Young Player in the World

Best Club Coach in the World

Male

Female

Best National Team Coach in the World

Male (Dimitri Nicolaou Award)

Female

Best National Team in the World

Male

Female

Best Club in the World

Male

Female

Best Referee of the World

Notes and references
UMBRO Futsal Awards on futsalplanet.com
2014 voting results

References

 Awards
Awards established in 2000